Leonora is a 1985 Australian sex film about a couple who have an open marriage.

Plot
Ex motor ace Simon Erickson pushes his wife Leonara into an open marriage. She has an affair with Mark Trainer.

Release
The movie was not released theatrically and went straight to video.

References

External links

1985 films
Australian erotic thriller films
1980s English-language films
1980s Australian films